Cedric Alfred Humphries (26 December 1913 – 18 November 1944) was an English first-class cricketer who played 13 matches, all for Worcestershire in 1934 and 1935.

Humphries made an unbeaten 41 in his first innings on debut, though Lancashire won the game in two days by a huge margin, at Worcester.
He made 44 — his career best — in his second match, against Cambridge University,
and 43* versus Nottinghamshire at Worksop in July,
but these were the only innings of his career in which he reached 40.

Two of his brothers, Gerald and Norman, also played briefly for Worcestershire.

Notes

External links
Statistical summary from CricketArchive

English cricketers
Worcestershire cricketers
1913 births
1944 deaths
Sportspeople from Kidderminster
British Army personnel killed in World War II
Worcestershire Regiment officers
Military personnel from Worcestershire